Yuri Koroviansky (30 September 1967 – 8 March 2017) was a Ukrainian volleyball player who competed for the Unified Team in the 1992 Summer Olympics. He was 194 cm tall. He was French citizen from 2011 until his death.

Biography
Koroviansky was born at Horlivka and debuted in 1984 for VC Shakhtar Donetsk. 
He finished seventh with the Unified Team in the 1992 Olympic tournament. With the Soviet (or Unified Team) national team he won a World Cup in 1991, the European Championships of 1991  and a bronze medal in the 1991 World League.

Koroviansky played in Greece from 1993 with AO Orestiada (Runner-up of the Greek championship and finished 4th in the CEV Cup final four). After one year in Greece, he signed in Cyprus for Paphiakos Paphos. He subsequently played in France with Tourcoing, Tours, Paris (won the French championship in 1997), Strasbourg, Halluin and he concluded his playing career in 2006 with Cambrai (in French 2nd league).

He was the head coach of youth team in Cambrai.

Honours

Club
1 Soviet Championship (1992)
1 Ukrainian Championship (1993)
1 French Championship (1998)

National team
1 World Cup (1991)
1 European Championship (1991)

References

External links
 profile

1967 births
2017 deaths
People from Horlivka
Ukrainian men's volleyball players
Soviet men's volleyball players
Olympic volleyball players of the Unified Team
Volleyball players at the 1992 Summer Olympics
Ukrainian volleyball coaches
Sportspeople from Donetsk Oblast